Jonas Hanway FRSA (12 August 1712 – 5 September 1786), was a British philanthropist and traveller. He was the first male Londoner to carry an umbrella and was a noted opponent of tea drinking.

Life

Hanway was born in Portsmouth, on the south coast of England. Whilst still a child, his father, who had been a victualler, died, and the family subsequently moved to London.

In 1729, Jonas was apprenticed to a merchant in Lisbon. In 1743, after he had been in business for himself for some time in London, he became a partner with Mr Dingley, a merchant in St Petersburg, and in this way was led to travel in Russia and Persia. Leaving St Petersburg on 10 September 1743, and passing south by Moscow, Tsaritsyn and Astrakhan, he embarked on the Caspian Sea on 22 November and arrived at Astrabad on 18 December. Here his goods were seized by Mohammed Hassan Beg, and it was only after great privations that he reached the camp of Nadir Shah, under whose protection he recovered most (85%) of his property.

His return journey was embarrassed by sickness (at Resht), attacks from pirates, and six weeks' quarantine; he only arrived at St Petersburg on 1 January 1745. He again left the Russian capital on 9 July 1750 and travelled through Germany and the Netherlands to England (28 October). The rest of his life was mostly spent in London, where the narrative of his travels (published in 1753) soon made him a man of note, and where he devoted himself to philanthropy and good citizenship.

In 1756, Hanway founded The Marine Society, to keep up the supply of British seamen; in 1758, he became a governor of the Foundling Hospital, a position which was upgraded to vice president in 1772; he was instrumental in the establishment the Magdalen Hospital; in 1761 he procured a better system of parochial birth registration in London; and in 1762 he was appointed a commissioner for victualling the navy (10 July); this office he held till October 1783.

He died, unmarried, on 5 September 1786 aged 74 and was buried in the crypt at St. Mary's Church, Hanwell. A monument to his memory, sculpted by John Francis Moore was erected in the north transept at Westminster Abbey in 1786.

Hanway was the first male Londoner, it is said, to carry an umbrella, (following women who had been using umbrellas since 1705)  and he lived to triumph over all the hackney coachmen who tried to hoot and hustle him down. He attacked vail-giving, or tipping, with some temporary success; by his onslaught upon tea drinking he became involved in controversy with Johnson and Goldsmith. His last efforts were on behalf of child chimney-sweeps. He also advocated solitary confinement for prisoners and opposed naturalization of non-British Jews.

Opposition to tea 

Hanway was a staunch opponent of tea drinking. In 1756, he authored An Essay on Tea which argued that tea was "pernicious to health, obstructing industry and impoverishing the nation". Hanway stated that tea drinking caused bad breath, ugliness and weakened the nerves. Hanway was concerned about the nation's economic loss from the tea trade with China. He believed that Britain's national wealth was being given to other countries instead of being used in preparing the nation's defence and that excessive tea drinking was weakening the British population.

In 1757, Samuel Johnson, a tea drinker, wrote an anonymous negative review of Hanway's essay for the Literary Magazine. This led to a heated dispute between them. Johnson's review was controversial as it criticised the Foundling Hospital. The governors of the hospital considered taking legal action against the publisher of the Literary Magazine. However, the publishers of the magazine did not apologise or reveal Johnson's name but decided it was time for him to hand in his resignation as a reviewer.

Publications
Hanway created seventy-four printed works, mostly pamphlets. Of literary importance is the Historical Account of British Trade over the Caspian Sea, with a Journal of Travels, etc. (London, 1753). He's also cited frequently for his work with the Foundling Hospital, particularly his pamphlets detailing the earliest comparative "histories" of the foundation versus similar institutions abroad.

On his life, see also John Pugh, Remarkable Occurrences in the Life of Jonas Hanway (London, 1787); Gentleman's Magazine, vol. xxxii. p. 342; vol. lvi. pt. ii. pp. 812814, 1090, 1143-1144; vol. lxv. pt. ii. pp. 72 1722, 834-835; Notes and Queries, 1st series, i. 436, ii. 25; 3rd series, vii. 311; 4th series, viii. 416.

Sources
The Lives of Celebrated Travellers, Volume 2

References

Attribution

Further reading
 Roland Everett Jayne, Jonas Hanway: Philanthropist, Politician, and Author (1712–1786), London: Epworth Press, J. Alfred Sharp, 1929.

External links

1712 births
1786 deaths
18th-century philanthropists
People from Portsmouth
English travel writers
English philanthropists
English male non-fiction writers
Historians of Iran
Tea critics
Writers about Russia